Lóránd Szatmári (born 3 October 1988) is a Romanian-born Hungarian football player who plays for Szeged-Csanád.

Club career
On 29 July 2022, Szatmári signed with Szeged-Csanád.

References

External links
 Lóránd Szatmári profile at magyarfutball.hu
 
 Channel4
 UEFA
 Hivatasos Labdarugok Szervezete
 
 

1988 births
People from Petroșani
Romanian sportspeople of Hungarian descent
Living people
Hungarian footballers
Hungary under-21 international footballers
Association football midfielders
Pécsi MFC players
Reggina 1914 players
U.S. Avellino 1912 players
S.S. Monopoli 1966 players
MTK Budapest FC players
U.S. Salernitana 1919 players
Paksi FC players
Mezőkövesdi SE footballers
Puskás Akadémia FC players
Győri ETO FC players
Vasas SC players
Szeged-Csanád Grosics Akadémia footballers
Nemzeti Bajnokság I players
Nemzeti Bajnokság II players
Serie B players
Serie C players
Hungarian expatriate footballers
Expatriate footballers in Italy
Hungarian expatriate sportspeople in Italy